Tetris is a puzzle video game created by Soviet software engineer Alexey Pajitnov in 1984. It has been published by several companies for multiple platforms, most prominently during a dispute over the appropriation of the rights in the late 1980s. After a significant period of publication by Nintendo, the rights reverted to Pajitnov in 1996, who co-founded the Tetris Company with Henk Rogers to manage licensing.

In Tetris, players complete lines by moving differently shaped pieces (tetrominoes), which descend onto the playing field. The completed lines disappear and grant the player points, and the player can proceed to fill the vacated spaces. The game ends when the uncleared lines reach the top of the playing field. The longer the player can delay this outcome, the higher their score will be. In multiplayer games, players must last longer than their opponents; in certain versions, players can inflict penalties on opponents by completing a significant number of lines. Some versions add variations on the rules, such as three-dimensional displays or a system for reserving pieces.

Built on simple rules, Tetris established itself as one of the great early video games. By December 2011, Tetris had sold 202million copies – approximately 70million physical units and 132million paid mobile game downloads – making it one of the best-selling video game franchises of all time. The Game Boy version is one of the best-selling games of all time, with more than 35 million copies sold. Tetris is available on over 65 platforms, setting a Guinness world record for the most ported video game. Tetris is rooted within popular culture and its popularity extends beyond the sphere of video games; imagery from the game has influenced architecture, music and cosplay. The game has also been the subject of various research studies that have analyzed its theoretical complexity and have shown its effect on the human brain following a session, in particular the Tetris effect.

Gameplay
Tetris is primarily composed of a field of play in which pieces of different geometric forms, called "tetrominoes", descend from the top of the field. During this descent, the player can move the pieces laterally and rotate them until they touch the bottom of the field or land on a piece that had been placed before it. The player can neither slow down the falling pieces nor stop them, but can accelerate them in most versions. The objective of the game is to use the pieces to create as many horizontal lines of blocks as possible. When a line is completed, it disappears, and the blocks placed above fall one rank. Completing lines grants points, and accumulating a certain number of points or lines cleared moves the player up a level, which increases the number of points granted per completed line.

In most versions, the speed of the falling pieces increases with each level, leaving the player with less time to think about the placement. The player can clear multiple lines at once, which can earn bonus points in some versions. It is possible to complete up to four lines simultaneously with the use of the I-shaped tetromino; this move is called a "Tetris", and is the basis of the game's title. 

If the player cannot make the blocks disappear quickly enough, the field will start to fill, and when the pieces reach the top of the field and prevent the arrival of additional pieces, the game ends. At the end of each game, the player receives a score based on the number of lines that have been completed. The game never ends with the player's victory. The player can only complete as many lines as possible before an inevitable loss.

Since 1996, the Tetris Company has internally defined specifications and guidelines that publishers must adhere to in order to be granted a license to Tetris. The contents of these guidelines establish such elements as the correspondence of buttons and actions, the size of the field of play, the system of rotation, and others.

Game pieces

The pieces on which the game of Tetris is based around are called "tetrominoes". Pajitnov's original version for the Electronika 60 computer used green brackets to represent the blocks that make up tetrominoes. Versions of Tetris on the original Game Boy/Game Boy Color and on most dedicated handheld games use black-and-white or grayscale graphics, but most popular versions use a separate color for each distinct shape. Prior to the Tetris Company's standardization in the early 2000s, those colors varied widely from implementation to implementation.

Scoring
The scoring formula for the majority of Tetris products is built on the idea that more difficult line clears should be awarded more points. For example, a single line clear in Tetris Zone is worth 100 points, clearing four lines at once (known as a Tetris) is worth 800, while each subsequent back-to-back Tetris is worth 1,200. In conjunction, players can be awarded combos that exist in certain games which reward multiple line clears in quick succession. The exact conditions for triggering combos, and the amount of importance assigned to them, vary from game to game.

Nearly all Tetris games allow the player to press a button to increase the speed of the current piece's descent or cause the piece to drop and lock into place immediately, known as a "soft drop" and a "hard drop", respectively. While performing a soft drop, the player can also stop the piece's increased speed by releasing the button before the piece settles into place. Some games only allow either soft drop or hard drop; others have separate buttons for both. Many games award a number of points based on the height that the piece fell before locking, so using the hard drop generally awards more points.

Infinite game question
The question Would it be possible to play forever? was first considered in a thesis by John Brzustowski in 1992. The conclusion reached was that the game is statistically doomed to end. If a player receives a sufficiently large sequence of alternating S and Z Tetrominoes, the naïve gravity used by the standard game eventually forces the player to leave holes on the board. The holes will necessarily stack to the top and, ultimately, end the game. If the pieces are distributed randomly, this sequence will eventually occur. Thus, if a game with, for example, an ideal, uniform, uncorrelated random number generator is played long enough, any player will almost surely top out.

Modern versions of Tetris released after 2001 use a bag-style randomizer that guarantees players will never receive more than four S and Z pieces in a row by shuffling tetrominoes of all types for each 7 pieces. This is one of the "Indispensable Rules" enforced by the Tetris Guideline that all officially licensed Tetris games must follow.

Easy spin dispute 

"Easy spin", or "infinite spin", is a feature in some Tetris games where a tetromino stops falling for a moment after left or right movement or rotation, effectively allowing the player to suspend the piece while deciding where to place it. The mechanic was introduced in 1999's The Next Tetris, and drew criticism in reviews of 2001's Tetris Worlds.

This feature has been implemented into the Tetris Company's official guideline. This type of play differs from traditional Tetris because it takes away the pressure of higher level speed. Some reviewers went so far as to say that this mechanism broke the game. The goal in Tetris Worlds, however, is to complete a certain number of lines as fast as possible, so the ability to hold off a piece's placement will not make achieving that goal any faster. Later, GameSpot received "easy spin" more openly, saying that "the infinite spin issue honestly really affects only a few of the single-player gameplay modes in Tetris DS, because any competitive mode requires you to lay down pieces as quickly as humanly possible."

Henk Rogers stated in an interview that infinite spin was an intentional part of the game design, allowing novice players to expend some of their available scoring time to decide on the best placement of a piece. Rogers observed that "gratuitous spinning" does not occur in competitive play, as expert players do not require much time to think about where a piece should be placed. A limitation has been placed on infinite lock delay in later games of the franchise, where after a certain amount of rotations and movements, the piece will instantly lock itself. This is defaulted to 15 such actions.

History

Conception
In 1979, Alexey Pajitnov joined the Computer Center of the Soviet Academy of Sciences as a speech recognition researcher. While he was tasked with testing the capabilities of new hardware, his ambition was to use computers to make people happy. Pajitnov developed several puzzle games on the institute's computer, an Electronika 60, a scarce resource at the time. For Pajitnov, "games allow people to get to know each other better and act as revealers of things you might not normally notice, such as their way of thinking".

In 1984, while trying to recreate a favorite puzzle game from his childhood featuring pentominoes, Pajitnov imagined a game consisting of a descent of random pieces that the player would turn to fill rows. Pajitnov felt that the game would be needlessly complicated with twelve different shape variations, so he scaled the concept down to tetrominoes, of which there are seven variants. Pajitnov titled the game Tetris, a word created from a combination of "tetra" (meaning "four") and his favorite sport, "tennis". 

Because the Electronika 60 had no graphical interface, Pajitnov modelled the field and pieces using spaces and brackets. Realizing that completed lines filled the screen quickly, Pajitnov decided to delete them, creating a key part of Tetris gameplay. This early version of Tetris had no scoring system and no levels, but its addictive quality distinguished it from the other puzzle games Pajitnov had created.

Pajitnov had completed the first playable version of Tetris by June 6, 1984. Pajitnov presented Tetris to his colleagues, who quickly became addicted to it. It permeated the offices within the Academy of Sciences, and within a few weeks it reached every Moscow institute with a computer. A friend of Pajitnov, Vladimir Pokhilko, who requested the game for the Moscow Medical Institute, saw people stop working to play Tetris. Pokhilko eventually banned the game from the Medical Institute to restore productivity.

Pajitnov sought to adapt Tetris to the IBM Personal Computer, which had a higher quality display than the Electronika 60. Pajitnov recruited Vadim Gerasimov, a 16-year-old high school student who was known for his computer skills. Pajitnov had met Gerasimov before through a mutual acquaintance, and they had worked together on previous games. Gerasimov adapted Tetris to the IBM PC over the course of a few weeks, incorporating color and a scoreboard.

Acquisition of rights by Mirrorsoft and Spectrum HoloByte
Pajitnov wanted to export Tetris, but he had no knowledge of the business world. His superiors in the Academy were not necessarily happy with the success of the game, since they had not intended such a creation from the research team. Furthermore, copyright law of the Soviet Union created a state monopoly on import and export of copyrighted works, and the Soviet researchers were not allowed to sell their creations. Pajitnov asked his supervisor Victor Brjabrin, who had knowledge of the world outside the Soviet Union, to help him publish Tetris. Pajitnov offered to transfer the rights of the game to the Academy, and was delighted to receive a non-compulsory remuneration from Brjabrin through this deal.

In 1986, Brjabrin sent a copy of Tetris to Hungarian game publisher Novotrade. From there, copies of the game began circulating via floppy disks throughout Hungary and as far as Poland. Robert Stein, an international software salesman for the London-based firm Andromeda Software, saw the game's commercial potential during a visit to Hungary in June 1986. After an indifferent response from the Academy, Stein contacted Pajitnov and Brjabrin by fax to obtain the license rights. The researchers expressed interest in forming an agreement with Stein via fax, but they were unaware that this fax communication could be considered a legal contract in the Western world; Stein began to approach other companies to produce the game.

Stein approached publishers at the 1987 Consumer Electronics Show in Las Vegas. Gary Carlston, co-founder of Broderbund, retrieved a copy and brought it to California. Despite enthusiasm amongst its employees, Broderbund remained skeptical because of the game's Soviet origins. Likewise, Mastertronic co-founder Martin Alper declared that "no Soviet product will ever work in the Western world". 

Stein ultimately signed two agreements: he sold the European rights to the publisher Mirrorsoft, and the American rights to Spectrum HoloByte. The latter obtained the rights after a visit to Mirrorsoft by Spectrum HoloByte president Phil Adam in which he played Tetris for two hours. At that time, Stein had not yet signed a contract with the Soviet Union. Nevertheless, he sold the rights to the two companies for £3,000 and a royalty of 7.5 to 15% on sales.

Before releasing Tetris in the United States, Spectrum HoloByte CEO Gilman Louie asked for an overhaul of the game's graphics and music. The Soviet spirit was preserved, with fields illustrating Russian parks and buildings as well as melodies anchored in Russian folklore of the time. The company's goal was to make people want to buy a Russian product. The game came complete with a red package and Cyrillic text, an unusual approach on the other side of the Berlin Wall. The Spectrum HoloByte version was released for the same platform in January 1988.

Tetris was ported to platforms including the Amiga, Atari ST, ZX Spectrum, Commodore 64 and Amstrad CPC. At the time, it made no mention of Pajitnov and came with the announcement of "Made in the United States of America, designed abroad". Tetris was a commercial success in Europe and the United States: Mirrorsoft sold tens of thousands of copies in two months, and Spectrum HoloByte sold over 100,000 units in the space of a year. According to Spectrum HoloByte, the average Tetris player was between 25 and 45 years old and was a manager or engineer. At the Software Publishers Association's Excellence in Software Awards ceremony in March 1988, Tetris won Best Entertainment Software, Best Original Game, Best Strategy Program, and Best Consumer Software.

Stein was faced with a problem: the only document certifying a license fee was the fax from Pajitnov and Brjabrin, meaning that Stein sold the license for a game he did not yet own. Stein contacted Pajitnov and asked him for a contract for the rights. Stein began negotiations via fax, offering 75% of the revenue generated by Stein from the license. Elektronorgtechnica ("Elorg"), the Soviet Union's central organization for the import and export of computer software, was unconvinced and requested 80% of the revenue. Stein made several trips to Moscow and held long discussions with Elorg representatives. 

Stein came to an agreement with Elorg on February 24, 1988. On May 10 he signed a contract for a ten-year worldwide Tetris license for all current and future computer systems. Pajitnov and Brjabrin were unaware that the game was already on sale and that Stein had claimed to own the rights prior to the agreement. Although Pajitnov would not receive any percentage from these sales, he said that "the fact that so many people enjoy my game is enough for me".

Acquisition of rights by Nintendo and legal battle

In 1988, Spectrum HoloByte sold the Japanese rights to its computer games and arcade machines to Bullet-Proof Software's Henk Rogers, who was searching for games for the Japanese market. Mirrorsoft sold its Japanese rights to Atari Games subsidiary Tengen, which then sold the Japanese arcade rights to Sega and the console rights to BPS, which published versions for Japanese computers, including the MSX2, PC-88 and X68000, along with a console port for the Nintendo Family Computer (Famicom), known outside Japan as the Nintendo Entertainment System.

At this point, almost a dozen companies believed they held the Tetris rights, with Stein retaining rights for home computer versions. The Soviet Union's Elorg was still unaware of the deals Stein had negotiated, which did not bring money to them. Tetris was a commercial success in North America, Europe and Asia.

The same year, Nintendo was preparing to launch its first portable console, the Game Boy. Nintendo was attracted to Tetris by its simplicity and established success on the Famicom. Rogers, who was close to then Nintendo president Hiroshi Yamauchi, sought to obtain the handheld rights. After a failed negotiation with Atari, Rogers contacted Stein in November 1988. Stein agreed to sign a contract, but explained that he had to consult Elorg before returning to negotiations with Rogers. After contacting Stein several times, Rogers began to suspect a breach of contract on Stein's part, and decided in February 1989 to go to the Soviet Union and negotiate the rights with Elorg.

Rogers arrived at the Elorg offices uninvited, while Stein and Mirrorsoft manager Kevin Maxwell made an appointment the same day without consulting each other. During the discussions, Rogers explained that he wanted to obtain the rights to Tetris for the Game Boy. After quickly obtaining an agreement with Elorg president Nikolai Belikov, Rogers showed Belikov a Tetris cartridge. Belikov was surprised, as he believed at the time that the rights to Tetris were only signed for computer systems. 

The present parties accused Nintendo of illegal publication, but Rogers defended himself by explaining that he had obtained the rights via Atari Games, which had itself signed an agreement with Stein. Belikov then realized the complex path that the license had followed within four years because of Stein's contracts, and he constructed a strategy to regain possession of the rights and obtain better commercial agreements. At that point, Elorg was faced with three different companies seeking to buy the rights.

During this time, Rogers befriended Pajitnov over a game of Go. Pajitnov supported Rogers throughout the discussions, to the detriment of Maxwell, who came to secure the Tetris rights for Mirrorsoft. Belikov proposed to Rogers that Stein's rights would be cancelled and Nintendo would be granted the game rights for both home and handheld consoles. Rogers flew to the United States to convince Nintendo's American branch to sign up for the rights. The contract with Elorg was signed by executive and president Minoru Arakawa for $500,000, plus 50 cents per cartridge sold.

Elorg then sent an updated contract to Stein. One of the clauses defined a computer as a machine with a screen and keyboard, and thus Stein's rights to console versions were withdrawn. Stein signed the contract without paying attention to this clause, and later realized that all the contract's other clauses, notably on payments, were only a "smokescreen" to deceive him.

In March 1989, Nintendo sent a cease and desist to Atari Games concerning production of the NES version of Tetris. Atari Games contacted Mirrorsoft, and were assured that they still retained the rights. Nintendo, however, maintained its position. In response, Mirrorsoft owner Robert Maxwell pressured Soviet Union leader Mikhail Gorbachev to cancel the contract between Elorg and Nintendo. Despite the threats to Belikov, Elorg refused to give in and highlighted the financial advantages of their contract compared to those signed with Stein and Mirrorsoft.

On June 15, 1989, Nintendo and Atari Games began a legal battle in the courts of San Francisco. Atari Games sought to prove that the NES was a computer, as indicated by its Japanese name "Famicom", an abbreviation of "Family Computer". In this case, the initial license would authorize Atari Games to release the game. The central argument of Atari Games was that the Famicom was designed to be convertible into a computer via its extension port. This argument was not accepted, and Pajitnov stressed that the initial contract only concerned computers and no other machine. 

Nintendo brought Belikov to testify on its behalf. Judge Fern M. Smith declared that Mirrorsoft and Spectrum HoloByte never received explicit authorization for marketing on consoles, and on June 21, 1989, ruled in Nintendo's favor, granting them a preliminary injunction against Atari Games in the process. The next day, Atari Games withdrew its NES version from sale, and thousands of cartridges remained unsold in the company's warehouses.

Sega had planned to release a Genesis version of Tetris on April 15, 1989, but cancelled its release during Nintendo and Atari's legal battle; fewer than ten copies were manufactured. A new port of the arcade version by M2 was included in the Sega Genesis Mini microconsole, released in September 2019.

Commercial success and acquisition of rights by Pajitnov

Through the legal history of the license, Pajitnov gained a reputation in the West. He was regularly invited by journalists and publishers, through which he discovered that his game had sold millions of copies, from which he had not made any money. However, he remained humble and proud of the game, which he considered "an electronic ambassador of benevolence".

In January 1990, Pajitnov was invited by Spectrum HoloByte to the Consumer Electronics Show, and was immersed in American life for the first time. After a period of adaptation, he explored American culture in several cities, including Las Vegas, San Francisco, New York City and Boston. He engaged in interviews with several hosts, including the directors of Nintendo of America. He marveled at the freedom and the advantages of Western society, and spoke often of his travels to his colleagues upon returning to the Soviet Union. He realized that there was no market in Russia for their programs. At the same time, sales of the Game Boy – bundled with a handheld version of Tetris – exploded, exceeding sales forecasts three times.

In 1991, Pajitnov and Pokhilko emigrated to the United States. Pajitnov moved to Seattle, where he produced games for Spectrum HoloByte. In April 1996, as agreed with the Academy ten years earlier and following an agreement with Rogers, the rights to Tetris reverted to Pajitnov. Pajitnov and Rogers founded the Tetris Company in June 1996 to manage the rights on all platforms, the previous agreements having expired. Pajitnov now receives a royalty for each Tetris game and derivative sold worldwide. 

In 2002, Pajitnov and Rogers founded Tetris Holding after the purchase of the game's remaining rights from Elorg, now a private entity following the dissolution of the Soviet Union. The Tetris Company now owns all rights to the Tetris brand, and is mainly responsible for removing unlicensed clones from the market. The company regularly calls on Apple Inc. and Google to remove illegal versions from their mobile app stores. In one notable 2012 case, Tetris Holding, LLC v. Xio Interactive, Inc., Tetris Holding and the Tetris Company defended its copyright against an iOS clone, which established a new stance on evaluating video game clone infringements based on look and feel.

In December 2005, Electronic Arts acquired Jamdat, a company specializing in mobile games. Jamdat had previously bought a company founded by Rogers in 2001, which managed the Tetris license on mobile platforms. As a result, Electronic Arts held a 15-year license on all mobile phone releases of Tetris, which expired on April 21, 2020.

Versions

Tetris has been released on a multitude of platforms since the creation of the original version on the Electronika 60. The game is available on most game consoles and is playable on personal computers, smartphones and iPods. Guinness World Records recognized Tetris as the most ported video game in history, having appeared on over 65 different platforms as of October 2010.

Since the 2000s, internet versions of the game have been developed. However, commercial versions not approved by the Tetris Company tend to be purged due to company policy. The most famous online version, Tetris Friends by Tetris Online, Inc., had attracted over a million registered users. Tetris Online had also developed versions for console-based digital download services. Because of its popularity and simplicity of development, Tetris is often used as a hello world project for programmers coding for a new system or programming language. This has resulted in the availability of a large number of ports for different platforms. For instance, μTorrent and GNU Emacs contain similar shape-stacking games as easter eggs.

Within official franchise installments, each version has made improvements to accommodate advancing technology and the goal to provide a more complete game. Developers are given freedom to add new modes of play and revisit the concept from different angles. Some concepts developed on official versions have been integrated into the Tetris guidelines in order to standardize future versions and allow players to migrate between different versions with little effort. The IBM PC version was the most evolved from the original version, featuring a graphical interface, colored tetrominoes, running statistics for the number of tetrominoes placed, and a guide for the controls.

In 2020 the intellectual property of the license belongs to Blue Planet Software. Maya (daughter of Rogers) supervises licenses to developers controlling their products.

Computational complexity 
In computer science, it is common to analyze the computational complexity of problems, including real life problems and games. It was proven that for the "offline" version of Tetris (the player knows the complete sequence of pieces that will be dropped, i.e. there is no hidden information) the following objectives are NP-complete:
 Maximizing the number of rows cleared while playing the given piece sequence.
 Maximizing the number of pieces placed before a loss occurs.
 Maximizing the number of simultaneous clearing of four rows.
 Minimizing the height of the highest filled grid square over the course of the sequence.

Also, it is difficult to even approximately solve the first, second, and fourth problem.

To prove NP-completeness, it was shown that there is a polynomial reduction between the 3-partition problem, which is also NP-complete, and the Tetris problem.

Music

The earliest versions of Tetris had no music. The NES version includes two original compositions by Hirokazu Tanaka along with an arrangement of "Dance of the Sugar Plum Fairy" from the second act of The Nutcracker, composed by Tchaikovsky. The Tengen version also features original music, and an arrangement of "Kalinka" and "Katyusha". 1860s Russian folk tune "Korobeiniki" first appeared in Spectrum Holobyte's 1988 versions of Tetris together "Dark Eyes", "Polyushko-polye" and "The Birch Tree".

Nintendo's Game Boy version also includes "Korobeiniki", as well as the Johann Sebastian Bach's French Suite No. 3 In B Minor (BWV 814), and an original track by Tanaka. "Korobeiniki" is used in most versions of the game, and has appeared in other games, albums and films that make reference to Tetris. It was also included in the SNES Tetris game, Tetris & Dr. Mario, Tetris DS and Blue Planet Software The Next Tetris (1999, PSX and Windows). Doctor Spin's 1992 Eurodance cover (under the name "Tetris") reached #6 on the UK singles chart. In the 2000s, the Tetris Company added as a prerequisite for the granting of the license that a version of "Korobeiniki" be available in the game.

Cognitive effects 

Tetris can cause the brain to involuntarily picture Tetris combinations even when the player is not playing (the Tetris effect), although this can occur with any computer game or situation showcasing repeated images or scenarios, such as a jigsaw puzzle. While debates about Tetris's cognitive benefits continue, some researchers view it as a milestone in the gamification of education. The Tetris Effect is when people who may play games like Tetris see floating pieces. Studies by American Psychologist Richard Haier discovered in 1992 that the brain used less energy as players' gaming skills got better. The study showed that regular Tetris playing allowed the brain to perform more optimally, and even increased the thickness of the cerebral cortex. Prolonged Tetris activity can also lead to more efficient brain activity during play. When first playing Tetris, brain function and activity increases, along with greater cerebral energy consumption, measured by glucose metabolic rate. As Tetris players become more proficient, their brains show a reduced consumption of glucose, indicating more efficient brain activity for this task. According to one study, moderate play of Tetris (half-an-hour a day for three months) boosts general cognitive functions such as "critical thinking, reasoning, language and processing" and increases cerebral cortex thickness.

Jackie Andrade and Jon May, from Plymouth University's Cognition Institute, and doctoral student Jessica Skorka-Brown have conducted research that shows that playing Tetris could distract from cravings and give a "quick and manageable" fix for people struggling to stick to diets, or quit smoking or drinking.

Harvard University researcher Robert Stickgold conducted extensive studies in 2000 relating sleep to Tetris. After playing several hours each night before bed, 60% of users reported seeing pieces of Tetris as they fell asleep, and even when they are waking up. This is a result of hours of game play, which allows the brain to start creating new neural pathways. This helps the brain recognize patterns easier and perform well with less effort. The brain starts to get trained to search for more images to organize. Players have been found to unconsciously think about ways they can fit objects together in real life, such as visualizing buildings or store shelves. Using his findings to build off of Richard Haier's previous work, he coined the term Tetris Effect.

In January 2009, an Oxford University research group headed by Emily Holmes reported that, for healthy volunteers, playing Tetris soon after viewing traumatic material in the laboratory reduced the number of flashbacks to those scenes in the following week. They believe that the computer game may disrupt the memories that are retained of the sights and sounds witnessed at the time, and which are later re-experienced through involuntary, distressing flashbacks of that moment. The group hoped to develop this approach further as a potential intervention to reduce the flashbacks experienced in post-traumatic stress disorder but emphasized that these are only preliminary results. A 2017 study found that people who played Tetris, and similar games such as Candy Crush, while waiting for treatment following traffic accidents had fewer intrusive memories the following week.

A study conducted by Mind Research Network in 2009 noticed that girls who played Tetris for 30 minutes over a 3 month period showed a higher function in brain efficiency, and cortical thickness. Prolong Tetris playing may have significant improvement on players' cognitive skills, spatial awareness, and memory retention.

Another notable effect is that, according to a Canadian study in April 2013, playing Tetris has been found to treat older adolescents with amblyopia (lazy eye), which was better than patching a victim's well eye to train their weaker eye. Robert Hess of the research team said: "It's much better than patching – much more enjoyable; it's faster, and it seems to work better". Tested in the United Kingdom, this experiment also appears to help children with that problem.

Tetris is addictive because of the Zeigarnik effect, that the human brain stores incomplete tasks, and disposes of them when no longer needed. Tetris, by constantly creating new unfinished tasks, holds our attention.

A study in 2021 conducted a data extraction on 28 studies conducted between 2006-2021, and found a positive correlation to reduced stress with playing casual games. The study categorized Tetris as a casual video game. Tetris was also included in this category as a relaxation tool for many who struggled with anxiety.

Reception and legacy

Compute! called the IBM version of Tetris "one of the most addictive computer games this side of the Berlin Wall ... [it] is not the game to start if you have work to do or an appointment to keep. Consider yourself warned". Orson Scott Card joked that the game "proves that Russia still wants to bury us. I shudder to think of the blow to our economy as computer productivity drops to 0". Noting that Tetris was not copy-protected, he wrote: "Obviously, the game is meant to find its way onto every American machine". 

The IBM version of the game was reviewed in 1988 in Dragon No. 135 by Hartley, Patricia, and Kirk Lesser in "The Role of Computers" column. The reviewers gave the game 4.5 out of 5 stars. The Lessers later reviewed Spectrum HoloByte's Macintosh version of Tetris in 1989 in Dragon No. 141, giving that version 5 out of 5 stars. 

Macworld reviewed the Macintosh version of Tetris in 1988, praising its strategic gameplay, stating that "Tetris offers the rare combination of being simple to learn but extremely challenging to play", and also praising the inclusion of the Desk Accessory version, which uses less RAM. Macworld summarized their review by listing Tetris' pros and cons, stating that Tetris is "elegant; easy to play; challenging and addicting; requires quick thinking, long-term strategy, and lightning reflexes" and listed Tetris''' cons as "None".

Roy Wagner reviewed the game for Computer Gaming World, and said that "Tetris is simple in concept, simple to play, and a unique design".

There was a hoax that circulated in February 2019 that the original NES instruction manual for Tetris had named the seven tetrominoes with names like "Orange Ricky", "Hero" and "Smashboy", but was disproven. Despite being disproven by video game historians, a question on the October 7 that year airing of Jeopardy! alluded to these names.

 Sales 
Tetris gained greater success with the release of Nintendo's NES version and Game Boy version in 1989. It topped the Japanese sales charts during AugustSeptember 1989 and from December 1989 to January 1990. Tetris became Nintendo's top-seller for the first few months of 1990. Nintendo's versions of Tetris sold  copies in the United States by 1992, and more than  worldwide by 1996.

Sega's arcade version of Tetris was successful in Japan, where it became the highest-grossing arcade game of 1989. Spectrum HoloByte's PC versions of Tetris sold more than  copies , with women accounting for nearly half of Tetris players, in contrast to most other PC games.

In January 2010, the Tetris franchise had sold more than 170 million copies, including approximately 70 million physical copies and over 100 million copies for cell phones, making it one of the best-selling video game franchises of all time. , Tetris has sold 132million paid mobile game downloads.

 Accolades 
In 1993, the ZX Spectrum version of the game was voted number 49 in the Your Sinclair Official Top 100 Games of All Time. In 1996, Tetris Pro was ranked the 38th best game of all time by Amiga Power. Entertainment Weekly picked the game as the #8 greatest game available in 1991, saying: "Thanks to Nintendo's endless promotion, Tetris has become one of the most popular video games".Computer Gaming World gave Tetris the 1989 Compute! Choice Award for Arcade Game, describing it as "by far, the most addictive game ever". The game won three Software Publishers Association Excellence in Software Awards in 1989, including Best Entertainment Program and the Critic's Choice Award for consumers. 

In 1995, Flux magazine ranked Tetris 30th on their Top 100 Video Games. Computer Gaming World in 1996 ranked it 14th on the magazine's list of the most innovative computer games. That same year, Next Generation listed it as number 2 on their "Top 100 Games of All Time", commenting that "there is something so perfect, so Zen about the falling blocks of Tetris that the game has captured the interest of everyone who has ever played it". 

In 1999, Next Generation listed Tetris as number 2 on their "Top 50 Games of All Time", commenting that "Tetris is the essence of gameplay at its most basic. You have a simple goal, simple controls, and simple objects to manipulate". On March 12, 2007, The New York Times reported that Tetris was named to a list of the ten most important video games of all time, the so-called game canon. After announced at the 2007 Game Developers Conference, the Library of Congress took up the video game preservation proposal and began with these 10 games, including Tetris.

In 2007, video game website GameFAQs hosted its sixth annual "Character Battle", in which the users nominate their favorite video game characters for a popularity contest in which characters participate. The L-shaped Tetris piece (or "L-Block" as it was called) entered the contest as a joke character, but on November 4, it won the contest. On June 6, 2009, Google honored Tetris 25-year anniversary by changing its logotype to a version drawn with Tetris blocks – the "l" letter being the long Tetris block lowering into its place, seen here. In 2009, Game Informer put Tetris 3rd on their list of "The Top 200 Games of All Time", saying that "if a game could be considered ageless, it's Tetris". The Game Informer staff also placed it third on their 2001 list of the 100 best games ever.Electronic Gaming Monthlys 100th issue had Tetris as first place in the "100 Best Games of All Time", commenting that "Tetris is as pure as a video game can get. ... When the right blocks come your way - and if you can manage to avoid mistakes - the game can be relaxing. One mislaid block, however, and your duties switch to damage control, a mad, panicky dash to clean up your mess or die". Tetris was also the only game for which the list did not specify one or two versions; the editors explained that after deadlocking over which version was best, they concluded that there was no wrong version of Tetris to play. In 2007, Tetris came in second place in IGN's "100 Greatest Video Games of All Time".

In 1991, PC Format named Tetris one of the 50 best computer games ever. The editors called it "incredibly addictive" and "one of the best games of all time".

In 2015, The Strong National Museum of Play inducted Tetris to its World Video Game Hall of Fame.

 Research Tetris has been the subject of academic research. Vladimir Pokhilko was the first clinical psychologist to conduct experiments using Tetris. Subsequently, it has been used for research in several fields including the theory of computation, algorithmic theory, and cognitive psychology.

During the game of Tetris, blocks appear to adsorb onto the lower surface of the window. This has led scientists to use tetrominoes "as a proxy for molecules with a complex shape" to model their "adsorption on a flat surface" to study the thermodynamics of nanoparticles.

 Film Tetris appeared in the 2010 short animated film Pixels, and in the 2015 movie of the same name inspired by the former.

In 2014 it was announced that Threshold Entertainment had teamed up with the Tetris Company to develop Tetris - The Movie, a film adaptation of the game. Threshold's CEO described the film as an epic sci-fi adventure that would be the first part of a trilogy. In 2016, sources reported on a press release claiming the film would be shot in China in 2017 with an $80 million budget. However, no 2017 or later sources confirm the film ever actually went into production.

A movie titled Tetris, about the legal battle surrounding the game in the late 1980s, was announced in 2020, to star Taron Egerton as Henk Rogers. The movie is set to premiere on March 31, 2023, on Apple TV+.

 See also 

 Brain Wall and Blokken, game shows based on Tetris Ecstasy of Order: The Tetris Masters, a 2011 documentary about the 2010 Classic Tetris World Championship, featuring interviews with Pajitnov and Richard Haier
 Game Over (Sheff book), a 1993 book covering Nintendo history, including interviews with Pajitnov and others regarding Tetris licensing

 Notes 

 References 

Bibliography
Books
 
 
 
 
 
 

Instruction manuals
 
 
 

Video documentaries
 . Magnus Temple. 2004.
 . Adam Cornelius. 2011.The Story of Tetris at YouTube. Gaming Historian. 2019.

 Further reading 
 
 
 

 External links 

 
 
  (promoted as Tetris - The Movie''), first announced in 2014
 , dramatizing legal battles surrounding the game

 
Puzzle video games
1984 in the Soviet Union
1984 video games
Alexey Pajitnov games
DOS games
NP-complete problems
Russian inventions
Soviet brands
Soviet games
Soviet inventions
Video games developed in Russia
Video game franchises introduced in 1984
World Video Game Hall of Fame